Zhangguangcai Range or Zhangguangcai Ling, also known as Zhangguangcai Ridge or Zhangguang Cailing, is a mountain range located in the central part of the northern section of the mountains in Northeastern China, mostly in the territory of Heilongjiang Province, reaching southward to the northern part of Dunhua City, Jilin Province.

Zhangguangcai Range is divided into two branches, the west of the Jiaohe Basin (蛟河盆地) is the Xilaoye Range (西老爷岭), and the east of the Jiaohe Basin is the Weihu Range (威虎岭).

Geographic location
Zhangguangcai Range runs northeast-southwest, with an average altitude of more than 800 meters, and the main peak, Laotudingzi Mountain (老秃顶子山), is 1,686.9 meters high.

References

Mountain ranges of China
Landforms of Heilongjiang
Mountain ranges of Asia